Rüningen is a Stadtbezirk (borough) on the river Oker in the southern part of Braunschweig, Germany.

History

The village of Rüningen was first mentioned as Riungi in documents during the late 8th century. The village outside of Braunschweig was razed numerous times during the middle ages, so that during the late 14th century a fortified tower, the Rüninger Turm, was built there as part of the medieval fortifications of Braunschweig. During the 17th century an inn and toll house was added to the Rüninger Turm. The tower, having lost its military importance, was slighted in 1724, although the toll house remained. The decrepit toll house was torn down at his original location and rebuilt at the Altstadtmarkt in the city centre of Braunschweig after the end of World War II. In 1974, Rüningen, until then part of the disbanded rural district of Braunschweig, was incorporated into the city of Braunschweig and became a city district.

Mill

Rüningen is home to one of the largest gristmills in Germany. The mill, originally built sometime before 1312, was destroyed and rebuilt multiple times during its history.

Gallery

Politics
The district mayor Jürgen Buchheister is a member of the Social Democratic Party of Germany.

References

Boroughs and quarters of Braunschweig
Former municipalities in Lower Saxony